Jersey English may refer to:

New Jersey English, dialects of American English from New Jersey, U.S.
Channel Island English, from Jersey in the Channel Islands